Ivana Bratic (born 26 September 1988 in Bosnia and Herzegovina, Yugoslavia) is a Danish curler from Hørsholm.

She was alternate for the Danish team at the 2010 Ford World Women's Curling Championship in Swift Current, Canada.

Personal life
Bratic works as a nurse. She has a boyfriend and two daughters.

References

External links

Danish female curlers
Living people
1988 births
People from Hørsholm Municipality
Bosnia and Herzegovina emigrants to Denmark